Shahrak-e Sanati-ye Arasanj (also Romanized as Shahraḵ-e Sanʿatī-ye Ārāsanj) is a village in Zahray-ye Pain Rural District, in the Central District of Buin Zahra County, Qazvin Province, Iran. At the 2006 census, its population was 13, in 5 families.

References 

Populated places in Buin Zahra County